King of Dreams may refer to:
"King of Dreams", a song by Deep Purple from their 1990 album Slaves & Masters
King of Dreams, a novel in the Majipoor series by Robert Silverberg
Joseph: King of Dreams, a 2000 DreamWorks direct-to-video animated film based on the Bible
Dream (character), or King of Dreams, the main character in Neil Gaiman's comic book series The Sandman

See also
A Dream of Kings (disambiguation)